William Muir MacKinnon (18 January 1852 – 24 May 1942) was a Scottish footballer who played for Queen's Park and the Scotland national team in the 1870s.

With Queen's Park, MacKinnon won the first three Scottish Cup competitions in 1874, 1875 and 1876 (being no relation of teammate Angus MacKinnon), as well as the first Glasgow Merchants Charity Cup in 1877. He was also capped by Scotland, making nine appearances between 1872 and 1879, scoring five goals. As a player, he was described as "a brilliant dribbling artist".

MacKinnon was the only player who appeared in all of the first seven official international matches between Scotland and England, making him the first caps record holder in international football history. He held the Scotland record until March 1881, when Henry McNeil earned his 10th cap.

Outside the game he was an ironworks engineer and had a great interest in music with a talent for singing.

International goals
Scores and results list Scotland's goal tally first.

References

External links

International stats at Londonhearts.com

1852 births
1942 deaths
Scottish footballers
Scotland international footballers
Queen's Park F.C. players
Association football forwards
Footballers from Glasgow
People from Gorbals